Stenopadus andicola is a species of flowering plant in the family Asteraceae. It is found only in Ecuador. Its natural habitat is subtropical or tropical moist montane forests. It is threatened by habitat loss.

References

Further reading

Wunderlichioideae
Endemic flora of Ecuador
Endangered plants
Plants described in 1998
Taxonomy articles created by Polbot